Tuesday Night Titans (abbreviated TNT) was a professional wrestling talk show produced by the World Wrestling Federation (WWF). It aired on the USA Network from May 29, 1984 to September 24, 1986. The two-hour show began airing on Tuesday nights from on May 29 to December 18, 1984. From January 4, 1985 to March 28, 1986, the show was cut to one-hour and moved to Friday nights. On April 2, 1986, the show was moved to Wednesday nights, where it remained there until its final episode on September 24, 1986. All episodes of Tuesday Night Titans are available on the WWE Network.

Overview
This format is best remembered for being a loose parody of a standard late-night talk show, with host Vince McMahon and "sidekick" Lord Alfred Hayes conducting in character interviews with WWF wrestlers and participating in skits. In episode 87, Gene Okerlund replaced McMahon as host, and remained host for the last 13 episodes. An in-studio audience would react to wrestlers in kayfabe, booing the bad guys and getting excited for heroic characters.

The program was named after the WWF's then-parent company, Titan Sports. It was taped at the Video One facilities in Owings Mills, Maryland, a suburb of Baltimore.

Episodes of TNT were re-aired on WWE Classics on Demand from November 2004 to February 2009. As of 2022, all 99 episodes are available for streaming on the WWE Network.

References

External links
 

1984 American television series debuts
1986 American television series endings
English-language television shows
Television series by WWE
USA Network original programming
1980s American television talk shows